neXtProt is an on-line knowledge platform on human proteins.
It strives to be a comprehensive resource that provides a variety of
types of information on human proteins, such as their function, 
subcellular location, expression, interactions and role in diseases.
The major part of the information in neXtProt

is obtained from the UniProt Swiss-Prot database but it is complemented by data originating from high-throughput studies with an emphasis on proteomics. neXtProt offers also an advanced search capacity based on the SPARQL technology as well as an API that allows to programatically extract the data stored in the resource. It is developed by the CALIPHO group directed by Amos Bairoch and Lydie Lane of the Swiss Institute of Bioinformatics (SIB).

References

External links
neXtProt - Exploring the universe of human proteins
UniProt - The Universal protein resource
SIB - The Swiss Institute of Bioinformatics
GitHub directory for neXtProt code

Molecular biology
Biological databases
Human biology
Human proteins